HD 147513 b is an exoplanet approximately 42 light-years away in the constellation of Scorpius. It is at least 21% more massive than Jupiter. But unlike Jupiter, it orbits the star much closer, mean distance being only a third more than Earth's distance from the Sun. Its orbit is also eccentric; at periastron, it is closer to its star than Earth is from the Sun, whereas at apastron, it is further from its star than Mars to the Sun, finding itself on the outer edge of the habitable zone.

References

HD 147513
Exoplanets discovered in 2002
Giant planets
Exoplanets detected by radial velocity